The Faculty of Architecture Poznań University of Technology (Pl. Wydział Architektury Politechniki Poznańskiej) is one of the schools of architecture in Poland. It was founded in 1950, existed until 1954. The founder was Władysław Czarnecki. In 1999 the faculty was revived by Robert Ast.

Departments:
 Department of Architecture of the Services and Housing
 Institute of Architecture and Planning
 Department of Drawing, Painting, Sculpture

List of presidents:
 Władysław Czarnecki (1950-1954)
 Robert Ast (1999-2002)
 Wojciech Bonenberg (2002-2008)
 Jerzy Suchanek (2008-2016)
Ewa Pruszewicz-Sipińska (2016-)

References 

Universities and colleges in Poznań
Poznan
Educational institutions established in 1950
1950 establishments in Poland
Educational institutions established in 1999
1999 establishments in Poland